Stronger Than My Heart is the third album from the Christian rock band onehundredhours, and was their first widely available album on the Survivor Records label.

Track list
King of Every Heart (3.39)
He is Good (4.12)
I Believe in Love (4.04)
Light it Up (3.07)
O Love, My Love (4.53)
You Are The One (4.43)
River Wide (4.33)
All of Me (2.36)
One Day (4.49)
Make Me Okay (3.22)

Special edition
In 2005, a special edition of Stronger Than My Heart was released. Paul Hicks, who has worked with bands such as Coldplay, Placebo and Travis in the secular stream, remixed the track 'King of Every Heart'. This was accompanied by a video of the song which was directed by Andy Hutch, who in the past has experience of working with The Thrills and Propellerheads.

Notes

Onehundredhours albums
2004 albums
Survivor Records albums